Detroit Catholic Central High School, commonly known as Catholic Central (CC), is a private, Catholic, all-male, college preparatory high school in Novi, Michigan, United States.  Founded in 1928 in Detroit, Michigan by the Archdiocese of Detroit, the school is operated by the Congregation of St. Basil.

The school was originally located on Harper Avenue in Detroit with an enrollment of 280 students; the school has made several moves in its history and now has an enrollment of over 1,000 students at its  campus in Novi. Detroit Catholic Central is currently ranked as the 4th best Catholic High School in the State of Michigan.

History
The current campus, built for $30 million, opened in August 2005. At the time it had 920 students.

Athletics
The Shamrocks compete in the Central Division of the Catholic High School League and in Class A/Division I (largest schools) of the Michigan High School Athletic Association.

Baseball (3 state titles: 1979, 1987, and 1999)
Basketball (2 state titles: 1961 and 1976)
Bowling (1 state title: 2010)
Cross country (6 state titles: 1983, 1984, 1989, 2001, 2009 and 2010)
Football (10 state titles: 1979, 1990, 1992, 1995, 1997, 1998, 2001, 2002, 2003, and 2009)
Golf (5 state titles: 2003, 2010, 2015, 2016, 2017, 2022)
Ice hockey (16 titles: 1994, 1997, 1999, 2000, 2001, 2002, 2003, 2005, 2009, 2010, 2014, 2015, 2016, 2019, 2021, 2022, 2023 )
Lacrosse (1 state title: 2018)
Rugby
Skiing
Soccer (2 state titles: 2017, 2020)
Swimming and diving
Tennis (3 state titles: 1985, 1986, 2010)
Track and field
Wrestling (15 state titles: 1969, 1970, 1971, 1974, 1978, 1983, 1988, 2010, 2012, 2013, 2014, 2017, 2018, 2019, 2020)

Catholic Central's athletic rival is Brother Rice High School in Bloomfield Hills.

Notable alumni

 Vince Banonis, All-American collegiate football player, All-NFL player, inducted into College Football Hall of Fame
 Jack Berry, sports journalist
 Thomas E. Brennan, Chief Justice of the Michigan Supreme Court, founder of the Thomas M. Cooley Law School
 Doug Brzezinski, college football and NFL player
 Michael J. Byrnes, Metropolitan Archbishop of Agaña and former Auxiliary Bishop for the Archdiocese of Detroit
 Steve Campbell, ATP Tennis player
 Mike Cox, Michigan Attorney General
 Sean Cox, United States District Judge for the Eastern District of Michigan
 Andy Dillon, Michigan Treasurer, Michigan Speaker of the House
 James Finn Garner, satirist and author of Politically Correct Bedtime Stories
 Joshua Gatt, winger/fullback for Tippeligaen soccer team
 Bryan Gruley, author and Chicago Bureau Chief of The Wall Street Journal
 Charlie Haeger, MLB pitcher
 Stan Heath, college basketball head coach
 Ray Herbert, MLB pitcher
 Art Houtteman, MLB player
 Tom LaGarde, NBA player, member of the 1976 US Olympic Gold Medal Basketball team
 Mike Martin, college and NFL player
 Greg Marx, NFL player
 Thaddeus McCotter, United States Congressman
 John McHale, baseball general manager
 Mark Messner, college and NFL player
 Al Moran, MLB shortstop
 David Moss, NHL forward
 Kevin O'Connor, co-founder of online advertising company DoubleClick
 Phil Parsons, NASCAR driver
 James Piot, 2021 U.S. Amateur golf champion
 Vasik Rajlich, International Master in chess and developer of Rybka
 James L. Ryan, senior judge, United States Court of Appeals for the Sixth Circuit
 Paul Rudzinski, NFL linebacker, Green Bay Packers, All-Big Ten Conference, Michigan State
 Chris Sabo, MLB third baseman
 Jay Sebring, hair stylist, murdered by Manson Family in 1969
 Alex Shelley, professional wrestler
 Anthony E. Siegman, professor of electrical engineering at Stanford University, pioneer in the fields of lasers and masers
 Frank Tanana, MLB pitcher
 Bernard White, actor, screenwriter and film director
 Bill Wightkin, NFL lineman
 Kerry Zavagnin, MLS and US National Team soccer player

 Mike Duggan, Current Mayor of Detroit

Notes and references

External links

 Official Catholic Central website
 Detroit News Article "Catholic Central High School is ready for new home in Novi"
 MHSAA ice hockey records

Roman Catholic Archdiocese of Detroit
Educational institutions established in 1928
Catholic secondary schools in Michigan
Schools in Novi, Michigan
Boys' schools in Michigan
High schools in Oakland County, Michigan
Schools in Wayne County, Michigan
Basilian schools
1928 establishments in Michigan
 
School buildings completed in 2005